The NHRA Powerade Drag Racing Series was a series of drag racing events that took place in the USA between 2002 and 2008. The series, taking place each year, is now known as the NHRA Camping World Drag Racing Series. It is the top competition division of the NHRA.

The following are the results of the 2005 season.

Schedule

References 

NHRA
NHRA Powerade